The Berkshire Scenic Railway Museum  is a railroad museum located in Lenox, Massachusetts, United States, that offers historical exhibits. The museum was founded in 1984 as a not-for-profit organization. During the 1980s and 2003-2011 it offered tourist train rides between Lenox and Stockbridge on the Housatonic Railroad right-of-way. In 2016 the museum began tourist train service in North Adams, Massachusetts.

Initial train service
In 1984 the Berkshire Scenic Railway Museum began operating passenger excursions between Lee and Great Barrington, over tracks owned by the Housatonic Railroad. Due to deteriorating track conditions, passenger operations were suspended in 1989. The excursion trains returned in 2003, based at the restored station in Lenox, with regular schedules to Lee and Stockbridge. Special events are sometimes held in conjunction with railroad operations.

In 2011, the Housatonic Railroad announced it would not be renewing its agreement with the Berkshire Scenic Railway Museum which allowed the operation of excursion trains on its tracks. Colin Pease, spokesperson for HRRC, said, "The Housatonic Railroad has determined that the continued operation of the Berkshire Scenic Railway on Housatonic-owned tracks is no longer possible." Pease could not give a reason as to why the relationship suddenly changed.

Hoosac Valley Train
In 2014, the museum received a $200,000 state grant to move its excursion train operations and begin Hoosac Valley Service tourist train rides between Adams and North Adams. The Town of Adams spent $500,000 renovating a former car wash into a railroad station. MassDOT is purchasing this portion of the Adams Branch from private railroads.

In November 2015 the City of North Adams completed an agreement to lease land for a temporary passenger platform for the Hoosac Valley line. The museum announced that rail service would begin in May 2016, and that one-hour round trip rides would be offered every weekend through the summer, departing from North Adams.

References

External links
Berkshire Scenic Railway Museum

Museums established in 1984
Railroad museums in Massachusetts
Heritage railroads in Massachusetts
Museums in Lenox, Massachusetts